The men's hammer throw at the 2012 European Athletics Championships was held at the Helsinki Olympic Stadium on 28 and 30 June.

Medalists

Records

Schedule

Results

Qualification
Qualification: Qualification Performance 77.50 (Q) or at least 12 best performers advance to the final

Final

References

Qualification Results
Final Results

Hammer Throw
Hammer throw at the European Athletics Championships